Highgate Cemetery is a place of burial in north London, England. There are approximately 170,000 people buried in around 53,000 graves across the West and East Cemeteries. Highgate Cemetery is notable both for some of the people buried there as well as for its de facto status as a nature reserve. The Cemetery is designated Grade I on the Register of Historic Parks and Gardens. It is one of the Magnificent Seven cemeteries in London.

Location
The cemetery is in Highgate N6, next to Waterlow Park, in the London Borough of Camden. It comprises two sites, on either side of Swains Lane. The main gate is on Swains Lane just north of Oakshott Avenue. There is another, disused, gate on Chester Road. The nearest public transport (Transport for London) is the C11 bus, Brookfield Park stop, and Archway tube station.

History and setting
The cemetery in its original formthe northwestern wooded areaopened in 1839, as part of a plan to provide seven large, modern cemeteries, now known as the "Magnificent Seven", around the outside of central London. The inner-city cemeteries, mostly the graveyards attached to individual churches, had long been unable to cope with the number of burials and were seen as a hazard to health and an undignified way to treat the dead. The initial design was by architect and entrepreneur Stephen Geary.

On Monday 20 May 1839, Highgate (West) Cemetery was dedicated to St. James by the Right Reverend Charles James Blomfield, Lord Bishop of London. Fifteen acres (6 ha) were consecrated for the use of the Church of England, and two acres set aside for Dissenters. Rights of burial were sold either for a limited period or in perpetuity. The first burial was Elizabeth Jackson of Little Windmill Street, Soho, on 26 May.

Highgate, like the others of the Magnificent Seven, soon became a fashionable place for burials and was much admired and visited. The Victorian attitude to death and its presentation led to the creation of a wealth of Gothic tombs and buildings. It occupies a spectacular south-facing hillside site slightly downhill from the top of Highgate hill, next to Waterlow Park. In 1854 a further 19 acres (8 ha) to the south east of the original area, across Swains Lane, was bought to form the eastern part of the cemetery; this opened in 1860. Both sides of the Cemetery are still used today for burials.

The cemetery's grounds are full of trees, shrubbery and wildflowers, most of which have been planted and grown without human influence. The grounds are a haven for birds and small animals such as foxes. The Cemetery is now owned and maintained by a charitable trust, the Friends of Highgate Cemetery Trust, which was set up in 1975 and acquired the freehold of both East and West Cemeteries by 1981. In 1984 it published Highgate Cemetery: Victorian Valhalla by John Gay.

Graves

West Cemetery

The Egyptian Avenue and the Circle of Lebanon (previously surmounted by a huge, 280 years old Cedar of Lebanon, which had to be cut down and replaced in August 2019) feature tombs, vaults and winding paths dug into hillsides. The Egyptian Avenue and the Columbarium are Grade I listed buildings.

Notable West Cemetery interments
 Henry Alken, painter, engraver and illustrator of sporting and coaching scenes
 Jane Arden, Welsh-born film director, actor, screenwriter, playwright, songwriter, and poet
 John Atcheler, ‘Horse slaughterer to Queen Victoria’
 Edward Hodges Baily, sculptor
 Beryl Bainbridge, author
 Abraham Dee Bartlett, zoologist, superintendent of the London Zoo known for selling the popular African elephant Jumbo to P. T. Barnum

 Julius Beer (and family members), owner of The Observer.
 Francis Bedford, landscape photographer
 William Belt, barrister and antiquarian, best known for his eccentric behaviour
 Mary Matilda Betham, diarist, poet, woman of letters, and miniature portrait painter
 Eugenius Birch, seaside architect and noted designer of promenade-piers
 Edward Blore, architect known for his work on Buckingham Palace and Westminster Abbey
 Edwin Brett, publisher and pioneer of serialised sensational weekly fiction and 'penny dreadfuls'
 Jacob Bronowski, scientist, creator of the television series The Ascent of Man
 James Bunstone Bunning, City Architect to the City of London
 Robert William Buss, artist and illustrator
 Edward Dundas Butler, translator and senior librarian at the Department of Printed Books, British Museum
 Edward Cardwell, 1st Viscount Cardwell, prominent politician in the Peelite and Liberal parties, best remembered for his tenure as Secretary of State for War
 William Benjamin Carpenter, physician, invertebrate zoologist and physiologist
 Joseph William Comyns Carr, drama and art critic, gallery director, author, poet, playwright and theatre manager
 John James Chalon, Swiss painter
 Robert Caesar Childers, scholar of the Orient and writer
 Edmund Chipp, organist and composer
 Charles Chubb, lock and safe manufacturer
 Antoine Claudet, pioneering early photographer, honoured by Queen Victoria as "Photographer-in-ordinary"
 John Cross, English artist
 Philip Conisbee, art historian and curator
 Abraham Cooper, animal and battle painter
 Thomas Frederick Cooper, watchmaker
 John Singleton Copley, Lord Chancellor and son of the American painter John Singleton Copley
 Sir Charles Cowper, Premier of New South Wales, Australia
 Addison Cresswell, comedians' agent and producer
 George Baden Crawley, civil engineer and railway builder
 Charles Cruft, founder of Crufts dog show
 Isaac Robert Cruikshank, caricaturist, illustrator, portrait miniaturist and brother of George Cruikshank
 George Dalziel, engraver who with his siblings ran one of the most prolific Victorian engraving firms
 George Darnell, schoolmaster and author of Darnell's Copybooks
 David Devant, theatrical magician
 Alfred Lamert Dickens, the younger brother of Charles Dickens
 Catherine Dickens, wife of Charles Dickens
 John and Elizabeth Dickens, parents of Charles Dickens
 Fanny Dickens, elder sister of Charles Dickens
 William Hepworth Dixon, historian and traveller. Also active in organizing London's Great Exhibition of 1851
 The Druce family vault, one of whose members was (falsely) alleged to have been the 5th Duke of Portland.
 Herbert Benjamin Edwardes, Administrator and soldier, known as the "Hero of Multan"
 Joseph Edwards (sculptor), Welsh sculptor
 Thomas Edwards (author), (Caerfallwch), Welsh author and lexicographer
 Ugo Ehiogu, footballer
 James Harington Evans, Baptist pastor of the John Street Chapel
 Benjamin Hawes, 19th-century British Whig politician, known in UK parliament as "Hawes the Soap-Boiler"
 Michael Faraday, chemist and physicist (with his wife Sarah), in the Dissenters section
 Sir Charles Fellows, archaeologist and explorer, known for his numerous expeditions in what is present-day Turkey.
 Charles Drury Edward Fortnum, art collector and benefactor of the Ashmolean Museum
 Lucian Freud, painter, grandson of Sigmund Freud, and elder brother of Clement Freud
 John Galsworthy, author and Nobel Prize winner (cenotaph, he was cremated and his ashes scattered)
 Stephen Geary, architect (most notably of Highgate Cemetery)
 John Gibbons, ironmaster and art patron
 Stella Gibbons, novelist, author of Cold Comfort Farm
 Margaret Gillies, Scottish painter known for her miniature portraits, including of one of Charles Dickens
 John William Griffith, architect of Kensal Green Cemetery
 Henry Gray, anatomist and surgeon, author of Gray's Anatomy.
 Radclyffe Hall, author of The Well of Loneliness and other novels
 William Hall, founder with Edward Chapman of publishers Chapman & Hall
 William Dobinson Halliburton, physiologist, noted for being one of the founders of the science of biochemistry
 Philip Harben, English cook regarded as the first TV celebrity chef
 Sir Charles Augustus Hartley, eminent British civil engineer, known as 'the father of the Danube.'
 George Edwards Hering, landscape painter
 Edwin Hill, older brother of Rowland Hill and inventor of the first letter scale and a mechanical system to make envelopes
 Frank Holl, Royal portraitist
 Ian Holm, English Actor
 James Holman, 19th-century adventurer known as "the Blind Traveller"
 Surgeon-General Sir Anthony Home, Victoria Cross recipient from Indian Mutiny
 Theodore Hope, British colonial administrator and writer
 Thomas Hopley, headmaster who beat one of his pupils to death
 William Hosking, first Professor of Architecture at King's College London and architect of Abney Park Cemetery
 Bob Hoskins, actor
 Georgiana Houghton, British artist and spiritualist medium
 David Edward Hughes, FRS, 19th-century electrical engineer and inventor
 William Henry Hunt, popular and widely collected painter of watercolours, nicknamed ‘Bird’s Nest’ Hunt
 Sir John Hutton, publisher of Sporting Life and Chairman of the London County Council
 Georges Jacobi, composer, conductor and musical director of the Alhambra Theatre
 Lisa Jardine, historian
 Victor Kullberg, one of the greatest marine clockmakers
 Thomas Landseer, younger brother of Sir Edwin Landseer (there is a cenotaph, Edwin was buried in St Paul's Cathedral)
 Sir Peter Laurie, politician and Lord Mayor of London
 Douglas Lapraik, shipowner and co-founder of HSBC and the Hongkong and Shanghai Hotels Group
 Henry Lee, surgeon, pathologist and syphilologist
 Oswald Lewis, MP and younger son of John Lewis, founder of the chain of department stores
 Robert Liston, surgeon
 Alexander Litvinenko, Russian dissident, murdered by poisoning in London
 Edward Lloyd, influential newspaper publisher and founder of the Daily Chronicle
 James Locke, a London draper credited with giving Tweed its name
 William Lovett, Chartist
 Samuel Lucas, editor of the Morning Star, journalist and abolitionist
 Archibald Maclaine (British Army officer)
 John Maple, founder of the furniture makers Maple & Co.
 Hugh Mackay Matheson, industrialist and founder of Matheson & Company and the Rio Tinto Group
 Frederick Denison Maurice, English Anglican theologian, prolific author and one of the founders of Christian socialism
 Michael Meacher, academic and Labour Party politician
 George Michael, singer, songwriter, music producer and philanthropist; buried beside his mother and sister
 Barbara Mills, (ashes) first female Director of Public Prosecutions
 Frederick Akbar Mahomed, internationally known British physician
 Jude Moraes, landscape gardener, writer and broadcaster
 Nicholas Mosley, novelist and biographer of his father, Oswald Mosley
 Edward Moxhay, shoemaker, biscuit maker and property speculator, best known for his involvement in the landmark English land law case Tulk v Moxhay
 Elizabeth de Munck, mother of celebrated soprano, Maria Caterina Rosalbina Caradori-Allan in grave with large carving of pelican in piety
 General Sir Archibald James Murray, Chief of Staff to the WW1 British Expeditionary Force
 Walter Neurath, Publisher and founder of Thames and Hudson
 Henry Newton, painter and co-founder of Winsor & Newton
 Samuel Noble, English engraver, and minister of the New Church
 George Osbaldeston, known as Squire Osbaldeston, sportsman, gambler and Member of Parliament (MP)
 Sherard Osborn, Royal Navy admiral and Arctic explorer
 Frederick William Pavy, physician and physiologist
 William Payne, actor, dancer and pantomimist
 Thomas Ashburton Picken, watercolourist, engraver and lithographer
 Frances Polidori Rossetti, mother of Dante Gabriel, Christina and William Michael Rossetti
 Samuel Phelps, Shakespearian actor and manager of Sadler's Wells Theatre
 Owen Roberts (educator), pioneer of technical education, great-grandfather of Antony Armstrong-Jones, 1st Earl of Snowdon, husband of Princess Margaret.
 James Robinson, dentist, first person to carry out general anaesthesia in Britain
 Peter Robinson, founder of the Peter Robinson department store at Oxford Circus, London
 Sir William Charles Ross, portrait and portrait miniature painter 
 Christina Rossetti, poet
 Gabriele Rossetti, Italian nationalist and scholar. Father of Christina and Dante Gabriel Rossetti
 William Michael Rossetti, co-founder of the Pre-Raphaelite Brotherhood
 Tom Sayers, pugilist, his tomb is guarded by the stone image of his mastiff, Lion, who was chief mourner at his funeral
 Henry Young Darracott Scott, responsible for the design and construction of the Royal Albert Hall
 Sir Peter Shepheard, architect and landscape architect, President of the RIBA, Architectural Association, Landscape Institute and the Royal Fine Art Commission
 Elizabeth Siddal, wife and model of artist/poet Dante Gabriel Rossetti and model for the painting Ophelia by John Everett Millais
 Jean Simmons, actress
 William Simpson, war artist and correspondent
 Sir John Smale, Chief Justice of Hong Kong
 Tom Smith, inventor of the Christmas cracker
 Charles Green Spencer, pioneer aviator and balloon manufacturer
 Alfred Stevens, sculptor, painter and designer
 Walter Fryer Stocks, prolific landscape painter
 Sir Henry Knight Storks, soldier, MP, and colonial administrator
 Anna Swanwick, author and feminist who assisted in the founding of Girton College, Cambridge, and Somerville Hall, Oxford
 Alfred Swaine Taylor, toxicologist, forensic scientist, expert witness
 Frederick Tennyson, poet, older brother of Alfred, Lord Tennyson
 Samuel Sanders Teulon, prolific Gothic Revival architect
 Jeanette Threlfall, hymnwriter and poet
 Charles Turner, mezzotint engraver who collaborated with J. M. W. Turner
 Andrew Ure, Scottish physician known for his galvanism experimentation, founder of the University of Strathclyde
 John Vandenhoff, leading Victorian actor
 Henry Vaughan, art collector who gave one of Britain's most popular paintings, John Constable's The Hay Wain to the National Gallery
 Emilie Ashurst Venturi, writer, translator and women's rights campaigner
 Arthur Waley, translator and scholar of the Orient
 George Wallis, First Keeper of the Fine Art Collection at the Victoria & Albert Museum
 Mary Warner, actress and theatre manager
 Augusta Webster, poet, dramatist, essayist, translator and advocate of women's suffrage
 Henry White, lawyer and gifted landscape photographer
 Brodie McGhie Willcox, founder of the P&O Shipping Line
 Henry Willis, foremost organ builder of the Victorian era
 Hugh Wilson, RAF test pilot
 George Wombwell, menagerie exhibitor
 Ellen Wood, author known as Mrs Henry Wood, there is also a plaque for her in Worcester Cathedral
 Adam Worth, criminal mastermind. Possible inspiration for Sherlock Holmes' nemesis, Professor Moriarty; originally buried in a pauper's grave under the name Henry J. Raymond
 Sir William Henry Wyatt, long-serving chairman of the Middlesex County Lunatic Asylum at Colney Hatch, Southgate
 Patrick Wymark, actor
 Arthur Wynn, British civil servant who ran a spy ring for the KGB
 Joseph Warren Zambra, scientific instrument maker

East Cemetery

Many famous or prominent people are buried on this side of Highgate cemetery; the most famous of which is arguably that of Karl Marx, whose tomb was the site of attempted bombings on 2 September 1965 and in 1970. The tomb of Karl Marx is a Grade I listed building for reasons of historical importance. Fireman's corner is a monument erected in the East Cemetery by widows and orphans of members of the London Fire Brigade in 1934. There are 97 firemen buried here. The monument is cared for by the Brigade's Welfare Section.

Notable East Cemetery interments
 David Abbott, advertising executive and founder of Abbott Mead Vickers BBDO who was widely regarded as one of the finest copywriters of his generation.
 Douglas Adams, author of The Hitchhiker's Guide to the Galaxy and other novels
 Mehmet Aksoy, press officer for the Kurdish YPG, killed by ISIS in 2017
 Wilkie Bard, popular vaudeville and music hall entertainer and recording artist
 Farzad Bazoft, journalist, executed by Saddam Hussein's regime
 Jeremy Beadle, writer, television presenter and curator of oddities
 Adolf Beck, the Adolph Beck case was a celebrated case of mistaken identity
 Hercules Bellville, American film producer
 William Betty, popular child actor of the early nineteenth century
 Emily Blatchley, pioneering Protestant Christian missionary to China
 Kate Booth, English Salvationist and evangelist. Oldest daughter of William and Catherine Booth. She was also known as la Maréchale
  William Bradbury, printer and publisher and co-founder of Bradbury and Evans
 Frederick Broome, colonial administrator of several British colonies. The Western Australian towns of Broome and Broomehill are named after him
 George Barclay Bruce, world renown railway engineer and president of the Institution of Civil Engineers
 Sir Thomas Lauder Brunton, 1st Baronet, Scottish physician who is most-closely associated with the treatment of angina pectoris
 James Caird, Scottish agricultural writer and politician
 Patrick Caulfield, painter and printmaker known for his pop art canvasses
 Douglas Cleverdon, radio producer and bookseller
 William Kingdon Clifford (with his wife Lucy), mathematician and philosopher
 Lucy Lane Clifford, novelist and journalist, wife of William Kingdon Clifford
 Yusuf Dadoo, South African anti-apartheid activist
 Lewis Foreman Day, influential artist in the Arts and Crafts movement
 Sir Davison Dalziel, Bt, British newspaper owner and Conservative Party politician. Massive mausoleum near the entrance.
 Elyse Dodgson, theatre producer
 Neave Brown, American-British architect

 Fritz Dupre, iron and manganese ore merchant, known as the "Manganese Ore King"
 Francis Elgar, naval architect
 George Eliot (Mary Ann Evans – the name on the grave is Mary Ann Cross), novelist, common law wife of George Henry Lewes and buried next to him
 Edwin Wilkins Field, lawyer who devoted much of his life to law reform
 Paul Foot, campaigning journalist and nephew of former Labour Party leader Michael Foot
 Lydia Folger Fowler, pioneering American physician and first American-born woman to earn a medical degree
 William Foyle, co-founder of Foyles
 William Friese-Greene, cinema pioneer and his son Claude Friese-Greene
 Lou Gish, actress, daughter of Sheila Gish
 Sheila Gish, actress
 Philip Gould, British political consultant, and former advertising executive, closely linked to the Labour Party
 Robert Grant VC, soldier and police constable
 Robert Edmond Grant, Professor of Comparative Anatomy at University College London who gave his name to the Grant Museum of Zoology
 Charles Green, the United Kingdom's most famous balloonist of the 19th century
 Leon Griffiths, creator of Minder
 Stuart Hall, Jamaican-born British Marxist sociologist, cultural theorist, and political activist
 Harrison Hayter, railway, harbour and dock engineer
 Mansoor Hekmat, Communist leader and founder of the Worker-Communist Party of Iran and Worker-Communist Party of Iraq
 Eric Hobsbawm, historian
 Austin Holyoake, printer, publisher, freethinker and brother of the more widely known George Holyoake
 George Holyoake, Birmingham-born social reformer and founder of the Cooperative Movement
 George Honey, popular Victorian actor and comedian
 Alan Howard, actor
 Leslie Hutchinson, Cabaret star of the 20s and 30s
 Jabez Inwards, popular Victorian temperance lecturer and phrenologist
 Georges Jacobi, composer and conductor
 Bert Jansch, Scottish folk musician
 Claudia Jones, Trinidadian born Communist and fighter for civil rights, founder of The West Indian Gazette and the Notting Hill Carnival
 George Goodwin Kilburne, genre painter
 David Kirkaldy, Scottish engineer and pioneer in materials testing
 Anatoly Kuznetsov, Soviet writer
 Liza Lehmann, operatic soprano and composer, daughter of Rudolf Lehmann
 Rudolf Lehmann, portrait artist and father of Liza Lehmann
 Andrea Levy, novelist best known for the novels Small Island and The Long Song
 George Henry Lewes, English philosopher and critic, common law husband of George Eliot and buried next to her.
 Roger Lloyd-Pack, British actor known for Only Fools and Horses and The Vicar of Dibley
 John Lobb, Society bootmaker
 Charles Lucy, British artist, whose most notable painting was The Landing of the Pilgrim Fathers
 Haldane MacFall, art critic, art historian, book illustrator and novelist
 Anna Mahler, sculptress and daughter of Gustav Mahler and Alma Schindler
 Chris Martin, Principal Private Secretary to the Prime Minister
 James Martineau, religious philosopher influential in the history of Unitarianism
 Karl Marx, philosopher, historian, sociologist and economist (memorial after his reburial, with other family members)
 Frank Matcham, theatre architect
 Carl Mayer, Austro-German screenwriter of The Cabinet of Doctor Caligari and Sunrise: A Song of Two Humans
 Thomas McKinnon Wood, Liberal politician and Secretary of State for Scotland
 Malcolm McLaren, punk impresario and original manager of the Sex Pistols
 Ralph Miliband, left wing political theorist, father of David Miliband and Ed Miliband
 Alan Milward, influential historian
 William Henry Monk, composer (of the music to Abide with Me)
 Charles Morton, music hall and theatre manager who became known as the Father of the Halls
 Sidney Nolan, Australian artist
 George Josiah Palmer, founder and editor of Church Times
 Charles J. Phipps, theatre architect
 Tim Pigott-Smith, actor
 Dachine Rainer, poet and anarchist
 Corin Redgrave, actor and political activist
 Bruce Reynolds, criminal, mastermind of the Great Train Robbery (1963)
 Ralph Richardson, actor
 George Richmond, painter and portraitist
 José Carlos Rodrigues, Brazilian journalist, financial expert, and philanthropist
 Ernestine Rose, suffragist, abolitionist and freethinker
 James Samuel Risien Russell, Guyanese-British physician, neurologist, professor of medicine, and professor of medical jurisprudence
 Raphael Samuel, Marxist historian
 James Sceats, Distiller, British distiller, wine & spirit and creator of El-Bart Gin 
 Anthony Shaffer, playwright, screenwriter and novelist
 Peter Shaffer, playwright and screenwriter
 Sir Eyre Massey Shaw, first Chief Officer of the Metropolitan Fire Brigade 
 Alan Sillitoe, English postmodern novelist, poet, and playwright
 James Smetham, Pre-Raphaelite Brotherhood painter, engraver and follower of Dante Gabriel Rossetti
 Sir Donald Alexander Smith, Canadian railway financier and diplomat
 Herbert Spencer, evolutionary biologist, sociologist, and laissez-faire economic philosopher
 Sir Leslie Stephen, critic, first editor of the Dictionary of National Biography, father of Virginia Woolf and Vanessa Bell, members of the Bloomsbury Group
 Julia Princep Stephen, Pre-Raphaelite model and mother of Virginia Woolf and Vanessa Bell, members of the Bloomsbury Group.
 William Heath Strange, physician and founder of the Hampstead General Hospital, now the Royal Free Hospital
 Lucien Stryk, American poet, teacher and translator of Zen poetry
 Thomas Tate, mathematician and scientific educator and writer
 Sir George Thalben-Ball, English organist, choirmaster and composer
 Bob Thoms, the greatest Victorian cricket umpire
 James Thomson, Victorian poet, best known for The City of Dreadful Night
 Storm Thorgerson, graphic designer
 Malcolm Tierney, actor
 Feliks Topolski, Polish-born British expressionist painter
 Edward Truelove, radical publisher and freethinker
 Peter Ucko, influential English archaeologist
 Max Wall, comedian and entertainer
 Simon Ward, actor
 Peter Cathcart Wason, pioneering psychologist
 Sir Lawrence Weaver, architectural writer, editor of Country Life and organiser of the British Empire Exhibition
 Opal Whiteley, American writer
 Colin St John Wilson, architect (most notably of the new British Library in London), lecturer and author
 Joseph Wolf, natural history illustrator and pioneer in wildlife art
 Edward Richard Woodham, survivor of the Charge of the Light Brigade
 Michael Young, Baron Young of Dartington, politician, social activist and consumer champion.

War graves
The cemetery contains the graves of 318 Commonwealth service personnel maintained and registered by the Commonwealth War Graves Commission, in both the East and West Cemeteries, 259 from the First World War and 59 from the Second. Those whose graves could not be marked by headstones are listed on a Screen Wall memorial erected near the Cross of Sacrifice in the west cemetery.

In popular culture

Highgate Cemetery was featured in the popular media from the 1960s to the late 1980s for its so-called occult past, particularly as being the alleged site of the "Highgate Vampire".

 Several of John Galsworthy's Forsyte Saga novels refer to Highgate Cemetery as the last resting place of the Forsytes; for example, Chapter XI, "The Last of the Forsytes," in To Let (1921).
 Footage of Highgate appears in numerous British horror films, including Taste the Blood of Dracula (1970), Tales from the Crypt (1972) and From Beyond the Grave (1974).
 In the BBC TV series Porridge, Fletcher claims that his eldest daughter, Ingrid, was conceived on Karl Marx's tomb.
 Herbert Smith is shadowed through Highgate Cemetery in Visibility, a murder/espionage/thriller by Boris Starling.
 Highgate Cemetery is the was the subject of episode 14 of the "How Haunted?" podcast.
 Highgate Cemetery is the sixth level of the Nightmare Creatures game.
 In Len Deighton's alternative history novel SS-GB and its TV adaptation, a bomb is detonated in the tomb of Karl Marx when his remains are exhumed by German occupation forces to be presented to the Soviet Union.
 Fred Vargas's novel Un lieu incertain starts in the cemetery.
 Barbara Hambly's vampire novel, Those Who Hunt the Night, has the main characters visiting Highgate at one point to examine the remains of a vampire who had taken over an abandoned tomb.
 Stated in the acknowledgments as the inspiration for the setting of Neil Gaiman's The Graveyard Book.
 Audrey Niffenegger's book Her Fearful Symmetry (2009) is set around Highgate Cemetery; she acted as a tour guide there while researching the book.
 In the novel Double or Die (2007), a part of the Young Bond series, Ludwig and Wolfgang Smith plan to kill Bond in the cemetery.
 Tracy Chevalier's book Falling Angels (2002) was set in and around Highgate Cemetery. The two main protagonists met there as children while their parents were visiting adjacent family graves and they continued to enjoy meeting up and playing there.
 The movie Hampstead (2017) features a few scenes in the cemetery.
 The climax of a novel by John Steele, Seven Skins (2018), was set in the Egyptian Avenue and Circle of Lebanon, among other locations in the West Cemetery.
 The movie Fantastic Beasts: The Crimes of Grindelwald (2018) features scenes towards the end of the film in the cemetery before the famous Cedar tree was removed.
 In the novel The Ink Black Heart (2022), the cemetery is an important location both in real-life plot and in virtual online game.

Gallery

References

External links

 
 Highgate Cemetery at the NY Times

1839 establishments in England
Anglican cemeteries in the United Kingdom

Cemeteries in London
Commonwealth War Graves Commission cemeteries in England
Grade I listed buildings in the London Borough of Camden
Grade I listed monuments and memorials
Grade I listed parks and gardens in London
Highgate
Parks and open spaces in the London Borough of Camden